Liuqing Yang from the Colorado State University, Fort Collins, Colorado was named Fellow of the Institute of Electrical and Electronics Engineers (IEEE) in 2015 for contributions to theory and practice of ultra-wideband communications.

References

Fellow Members of the IEEE
Living people
Colorado State University faculty
21st-century American engineers
Year of birth missing (living people)